The 1908 United States presidential election in Tennessee took place on November 3, 1908. All contemporary 46 states were part of the 1908 United States presidential election. Tennessee voters chose 12 electors to the Electoral College, which selected the president and vice president.

Background and vote
For over a century after the Civil War, Tennessee was divided according to political loyalties established in that war. Unionist regions covering almost all of East Tennessee, Kentucky Pennyroyal-allied Macon County, and the five West Tennessee Highland Rim counties of Carroll, Henderson, McNairy, Hardin and Wayne voted Republican – generally by landslide margins – as they saw the Democratic Party as the “war party” who had forced them into a war they did not wish to fight. Contrariwise, the rest of Middle and West Tennessee who had supported and driven the state’s secession was equally fiercely Democratic as it associated the Republicans with Reconstruction. After the disfranchisement of the state’s African-American population by a poll tax was largely complete in the 1890s, the Democratic Party was certain of winning statewide elections if united, although unlike the Deep South Republicans would almost always gain thirty to forty percent of the statewide vote from mountain and Highland Rim support.

During the 1908 election new GOP nominee William Howard Taft would in October become the first Republican candidate to tour the South, visiting Tennessee and North Carolina Aided by opposition by developing manufacturers to third-time Democratic nominee William Jennings Bryan’s populism, and by his willingness to accept black disfranchisement Taft gained noticeably given the extremely deep-rooted partisan loyalties established by the Civil War. Whereas Theodore Roosevelt had lost Tennessee by 10.87 percent in 1904, Taft, although doing worse nationally, lost only by 6.85 percentage points

Results

Results by county

Notes

References

Notes

Tennessee
1908
1908 Tennessee elections